Supercow may refer to:
Supercow (dairy), a high-producing dairy cow
Supercow (cartoon), the superhero alter-ego of Cow from Cow and Chicken
Supercow (mascot), the mascot of the Schulich School of Engineering
Supercow (video game), video game